Lingya District is a district of Kaohsiung, Taiwan. The 85 Sky Tower and the Kaohsiung City Hall are located here. Lingya District is the administrative center of Kaohsiung City along with Fongshan District. Its population is around 163,089 as of January 2023. It is the 6th most-populated district in Kaohsiung, with a population density of 19,916 people per square kilometer, or 51,581 people per square mile. It has a area of 8.1522 square kilometers, or 3.1476 square miles. The average elevation of Lingya is 6 meters, or 20 feet.

Name
After 1945, the community was combined with "Guotianzi", "Lingdeguan", and "Wukuaicuo" to form "Lienya District". In 1952 the original name Lingya was restored.

Administrative divisions

The district is divided into 69 villages, which are subdivided into 1,248 neighborhoods. Traditionally, Lingya is divided into 4 areas, although they are rarely used today. They are:
 Guotianzai <west central>
 Lindeguan <east central>
 Lingyaliao <west>
 Wukuaicuo <east>

Villages in the district are Boren, Lingzhou, Lingsheng, Lingzhong, Lingya, Lingtung, Chengbei, Chengxi, Chengtung, Yicheng, Guzhong, Tianxi, Renhe, Renzheng, Guangze, Meitian, Huatang, Rizhong, Puzhao, Hexu, Qinglang, Putian, Linfu, Linwei, Linan, Guanghua, Linxing, Linhua, Linxi, Linzhong, Linquan, Linnan, Zhongzheng, Shangyi, Tongqing, Kaixuan, Anxiang, Zoujie, Fushou, Funan, Wuquan, Minzhu, Linde, Lingui, Linrong, Yingming, Linjing, Zhaoyang, Fulong, Fuxiang, Fuhai, Fukang, Furen, Fude, Fuju, Futung, Fuxi, Yongkang, Zhengwen, Zhengyan, Zhengda, Wufu, Zhengxin, Zhengdao, Zhengyi, Zhengren, Wenchang, Jianjun and Weiwu Village.

Education

Universities
 National Kaohsiung Normal University

Schools
 Kaohsiung Japanese School
 Kaohsiung Municipal Jhong-Jheng Senior High School

Tourist attractions
 85 Sky Tower
 Birthday Park
 Chen Jhong-he Memorial Hall
 Chung Cheng Martial Arts Stadium
 Guanghua Night Market
 Holy Rosary Cathedral
 Kaohsiung City Lingya Sports Center
 Kaohsiung Cultural Center
 Kaohsiung Guandi Temple
 Kaohsiung Music Center
 Maritime Park
 Rainbow Park
 Sihwei Flower Park
 Singjhong Flower Market
 Singuang Ferry Wharf
 Tomb of Chen Jhong-he
 Water Tower Park

Transportation

Train stations
 KMRT Cultural Center Station
 KMRT Martial Arts Stadium Station
 KMRT Sanduo Shopping District Station
 KMRT Weiwuying Station
 KMRT Wukuaicuo Station
 KLRT Kaisyuan Park Station
 KLRT Department of Health Station
 KLRT Wucyuan Elementary School Station
 KLRT Kaisyuan Wuchang Station
 KLRT Cruise Terminal Station
 KLRT Glory Pier Station (connects to Glory Pier)

Highways

 Freeway 1
 Provincial Highways 1F and 17

Harbors
 Glory Pier

Notable natives
 A-Lin, singer
 Hsu Kun-yuan, former politician

References

External links